Bell Witch: The Movie (also known under the working title Tennessee 1) is a 2007 horror film. It is based on the Bell Witch legend and stars Betsy Palmer as the voice of the Bell Witch. It was released direct-to-video on September 1, 2007.

Plot
The film retells the haunting legend about the Bell Witch of Adams, Tennessee, a historically documented haunting that took place in the early 19th century.

The film is described as a love story turned tragic when entangled with the legendary haunting of the Bell Witch. After stumbling across an ancient burial (in what is now known as the Bell Witch cave), brothers John Jr. and Williams Bell bring a strange curse home to their family causing their father, John, and sister, Betsy, to experience phantom attacks in the night and strange visions during the day.

Filming details
Bell Witch: The Movie was shot in Townsend, Tennessee in September, 2002.  The film was shot and mastered in high definition and its release was delayed until the technology was more widely available.

References

External links
Official Website

2000s supernatural horror films
2007 horror films
2007 films
American ghost films
American supernatural horror films
Films shot in Tennessee
American folklore films and television series
Films about curses
2000s English-language films
2000s American films